Witwisit Hiranyawongkul (born 20 July 1989), popularly nicknamed "Pchy" ((also written "Pitch" or "Phit"), is a Thai actor and singer. He is best known for his first leading role as Mew in the 2007 hit film The Love of Siam, which won several newcomer awards and propelled him to fame in Thailand and throughout Asia.

Early life and education
Witwisit Hiranyawongkul was born and raised in Chiang Mai, Thailand. He attended Montfort College in Chiang Mai. He was admitted to the Faculty of Journalism and Mass Communications, Thammasat University, Bangkok. He started his first year in 2007 and graduated in 2011.

Career

Beginnings
Pchy entered the Thai entertainment business at the age of 17 while he was still in grade 12. He was discovered in his hometown by Chukiat Sakweerakul, writer and director of The Love of Siam. Chukiat is an alumnus of Montfort College and met Pchy because of their common music interests.

2007–2008: Acting debut and rising popularity

Pchy make acting debut with a leading role as Mew in the 2007 Thai multi-layered romantic-drama film The Love of Siam, which brought him wider recognition and several newcomer awards.

In 2008, Pchy was nominated in the Best Actor category in the Thailand National Film Association Awards for his breakthrough role in The Love of Siam. He was the youngest nominee in the category. Although he eventually lost to Akara Amarttayakul, he was happy to be nominated. He was also nominated in the Best Actor category in the Critics Assembly Award.  Pchy received Chalermthai award in the Lead Actor in Thai Film Category. 

In the same year, Pchy appeared in Thai R&B singer Nasnan's music video "Hak Tur Mod Rak" (If You Have Lost Your Love), as the singer's love interest. In the video, Pchy plays Nasnan's boyfriend whose love starts to wane and who becomes involved with another girl. Dove invited Pchy and Chukiat Sakweerakul to compose and sing a song titled "Chao Wan Mai" (Better Morning). The CD, which is not for sale, will be given to women throughout Bangkok.

2008–2014: Launched a band and activities

Pchy launched a band August, the boy band was made for the movie The Love of Siam but, they found themselves comfortable with each other so decided to pursue it into the Thai Entertainment Industry and which began by singing and playing in The Love of Siam's promotional events. The 13-member band (including Pchy) released their first album August*Thanx in February 2008. Their first full album Radiodrome was released in December 2008. On 10 January, Pchy recorded "Miss", the interlude in film Love on That Day.
 
Pchy's his first public work was singing the original soundtrack song for the movie Khao Niew Moo Ping. In The Love of Siam soundtrack, he also contributed several songs.

Awards and nominations

Acting

Music
August Band won Popular New Artist Award at Channel V Music Video Awards 2009.
 Bite of Love OST
 The Love of Siam OST
 August, thanx
Chao Wan Mai (Better Morning) Dove Campaign
Sunshine (Single, September 2008)
 August, Radiodrome (December 2008)
 August, SUMMER (2011)
 August, Light in the Dark Volume 1: The Traveler (Single, 2011)

Filmography
 The Love of Siam (2007)
Dopamine (Short movie, 2008)
4 Romance (2008)
Sai Sueb Delivery (TV series on Channel 3, February–March 2009)
Old Pals (2011)
Home (2012)
Grean Fictions (2013)
Club Friday The Series 5 (TV Series on GMM CHANNEL, 2015)

Commercial
Mama (Instant noodle brand) commercial with August Band (2008)
1-2-Free (mobile carrier) commercial (2008)

References

External links

 
 AugustBand Room PH Facebook

1989 births
Living people
Witwisit Hiranyawongkul
Witwisit Hiranyawongkul
Witwisit Hiranyawongkul
Witwisit Hiranyawongkul
Witwisit Hiranyawongkul
Witwisit Hiranyawongkul
Witwisit Hiranyawongkul